Syncarpa is a genus of ascidian tunicates in the family Styelidae.

Species within the genus Syncarpa include:
 Syncarpa corticiformis Beniaminson, 1975 
 Syncarpa oviformis Redikorzev, 1913

References

Stolidobranchia
Tunicate genera